The 13th Pan American Games were held in Winnipeg, Manitoba, Canada from July 23 to August 8, 1999.

See also
 Bolivia at the 2000 Summer Olympics

Nations at the 1999 Pan American Games
P
1999